The 1973 Louisville Open, also known as the First National Tennis Classic, was a men's tennis tournament played on outdoor clay courts at the Louisville Tennis Center in Louisville, Kentucky, USA. It was the fourth edition of the tournament and was held from 30 July through 5 August 1973. The tournament was part of the Grand Prix tennis circuit and categorized in Group A. The singles final was won by fourth-seeded Manuel Orantes who earned 80 Grand Prix points.

Finals

Singles
 Manuel Orantes defeated  John Newcombe 3–6, 6–3, 6–4
 It was Orantes' third singles title of the year and the tenth singles title of his career

Doubles
 Manuel Orantes /  Ion Țiriac defeated  Clark Graebner /  John Newcombe 0–6, 6–4, 6–3

References

External links
ITF tournament details

Louisville Open
Louisville Open
Louisville Open
Louisville Open